The Cataract House was a hotel in the neighborhood of Buffalo Avenue in Niagara Falls, New York. The hotel was established in 1825 but destroyed by fire in 1945. It was a major stop on the Underground Railroad and it was the largest hotel in Niagara Falls. The hotel's name infers to large and powerful waterfall next to property.

History

The Cataract House Hotel was built on the Niagara River bank in 1825 by owner David Chapman. The land for the hotel near what is now Old Main Street and Buffalo Avenue between Red Coach Inn and Niagara Falls State Park was originally owned by Judge Samuel DeVeaux. In 1831, Parkhurst Whitney purchased the hotel and ran it for several years.  Whitney later leased the hotel to a corporation run by his son, Solon Whitney (who owned the Whitney Mansion in Niagara Falls), and sons-in-law, James Fullerton Trott and Dexter Ray Jerauld.

After Whitney's death in 1862, his son Solon owned the Hotel until 1891 when it was sold to Peter A. Porter (who served as a U.S. Representative from 1907 to 1909).  Porter was the son of Peter Augustus Porter, who was the only son of Gen. Peter Buell Porter of War of 1812 fame.  The Porter family sold the hotel to John McDonald in 1909, who owned it until 1945.

Cataract House, which became "the most elegant and popular hotel on the American side," was host to Abraham Lincoln, Jenny Lind, Horace Greeley, William Seward, Franklin D. Roosevelt, King Edward VII (when he was the Prince of Wales), and King George V in 1939.

The hotel, which by then had occupied an entire city block was across the street from Red Coach Inn, was destroyed by fire in 1945. 

The site today is Heritage Park located between Buffalo Avenue and Riverway with roadway providing access to the Niagara Reservation – Niagara Falls State Park.

History with the Underground Railroad
The Cataract House employed an entirely African-American wait staff, who helped numbers of former slaves to freedom in Canada.

In 2018, a model of the hotel was constructed at the Niagara Falls Underground Railroad Heritage Center to highlight its history and importance to the Underground Railroad and the history of Niagara Falls.

Photos

References

External links

 History of the Cataract House and the Underground Railroad from the Niagara Falls Underground Railroad Heritage Area Commission

Buildings and structures in Niagara Falls, New York
1825 establishments in New York (state)
1945 disestablishments in New York (state)
Underground Railroad locations
Demolished hotels in New York (state)
African-American history of New York (state)